Kuh Pat (also Romanized as Kūh Pat; also known as Pā’īn Kūh-e Pāt and Pā’īn Kūh Pāt) is a village in Rak Rural District, in the Central District of Kohgiluyeh County, Kohgiluyeh and Boyer-Ahmad Province, Iran. At the 2006 census, its population was 19, in 5 families.

References 

Populated places in Kohgiluyeh County